Valerie Azlynn (born November 25, 1980) is an American actress. She has appeared in several television shows and movies, notably starring in the TV comedy Sullivan & Son.

Early life
Azlynn was born Valerie Asselin and raised in New London, Connecticut. She attended The Williams School and Waterford High School, and had open-heart surgery to repair an atrial septal defect at age 13.

On March 4, 1993, Azlynn's successful open heart surgery was performed, and it changed her life and her appearance forever. She started working with the Mended Little Hearts non-profit as their national spokesperson in 2013, where she works to help kids who had open heart surgery get beyond the stigma that comes from the unsightly scars.

Valerie moved to New York City after high school at the age of 17. She studied acting for two years at the New York Conservatory for Dramatic Arts (formerly the School for Film and Television).

Career
Azlynn moved to New York City at age 17 to pursue a career as an actress, building her résumé by performing in the theater and singing with an opera company in Manhattan, New York. She later moved to Los Angeles.

In 2004, Azlynn landed a supporting role in The Joe Schmo Show as Piper "The Bachelorette." She has since appeared in episodes of Hot in Cleveland, Cold Case, CSI: NY, The Big Bang Theory, Two and a Half Men, Rules of Engagement, How I Met Your Mother, Joey, iCarly, The Loop, Mr. Sunshine, and many others. From 2012 through 2014, Azlynn starred as Melanie on the TBS comedy Sullivan & Son.

Azlynn has appeared in roles on the big screen, including in Poseidon and Tropic Thunder, among others. In some early movies, Azlynn appeared under the name Valerie Asselin.

Filmography

Film

Television

References

External links 
 

1980 births
Actresses from Connecticut
American film actresses
American television actresses
Living people
People from New London, Connecticut
People with congenital heart defects
21st-century American actresses